Federal Response is a generic terms for a government response, usually to disaster. It is usually applies to the United States, which has a federal system of government. It can refer to:

In the United States Government
National Response Plan, also known as the Federal Response Plan
National Response Framework, which replaced the National Response Plan
Specific disasters:
Rescue and recovery effort after the September 11 attacks on the World Trade Center, 2001
Criticism of the government response to Hurricane Katrina, 2005

Other uses
Federal Response (Jericho episode), an episode of the TV series Jericho